Football competitions at the 2007 Pan American Games in Rio de Janeiro, Brazil were held between July 12 and 27, 2007. 

Matches were held at five stadiums in the city.

Medal summary

Medal table

Medalists

References

 
Soccer
Football
International association football competitions hosted by Brazil